Taj Pul is a census town in South district in the Indian union territory of Delhi.

Demographics
 India census, Taj Pul had a population of 58,220. Males constitute 56% of the population and females 44%. Taj Pul has an average literacy rate of 69%, higher than the national average of 59.5%: male literacy is 77%, and female literacy is 59%. In Taj Pul, 17% of the population is under 6 years of age.

References

Cities and towns in South Delhi district